The 1985 San Jose State Spartans football team represented San Jose State University during the 1985 NCAA Division I-A football season as a member of the Pacific Coast Athletic Association. The team was led by head coach Claude Gilbert, in his second year as head coach at San Jose State. They played home games at Spartan Stadium in San Jose, California. The Spartans finished the 1985 season with a record of two wins, eight losses and one tie (2–8–1, 2–4–1 PCAA).

Schedule

Team players in the NFL
No San Jose State Spartans were selected in the 1986 NFL Draft.

The following finished their college career in 1985, were not drafted, but played in the NFL.

Notes

References

San Jose State
San Jose State Spartans football seasons
San Jose State Spartans football